Vladimir Medved (born 4 November 1999) is a Belarusian professional footballer woh plays as a midfielder for Pirin Blagoevgrad.

Club career
On 12 July 2019, he signed with Russian Premier League club FC Rostov. He played for Rostov's Under-20 squad in the first half of the 2019–20 season, making 16 appearances and scoring 4 goals. On 10 February 2020, he was included in the Under-20 squad of another Russian club PFC Krylia Sovetov Samara for the pre-season FNL Cup, and on 12 February 2020 he was removed by Rostov from their squad. On 21 February 2020 he was registered with the RPL as Krylia Sovetov player. He left Krylia Sovetov on 31 May 2020.

He made his debut for the main squad of FC Rotor Volgograd on 21 October 2020 in a Russian Cup game against PFC Krylia Sovetov Samara. He made his Russian Premier League debut for Rotor on 17 March 2021 against FC Rostov.

References

External links 
 
 

1999 births
Footballers from Minsk
Living people
Belarusian footballers
Association football midfielders
Belarusian expatriate footballers
Expatriate footballers in Russia
Expatriate footballers in Kazakhstan
Expatriate footballers in Georgia (country)
Russian Premier League players
FC Slavia Mozyr players
FC Naftan Novopolotsk players
FC Dynamo Brest players
FC Slutsk players
FC Rostov players
PFC Krylia Sovetov Samara players
FC Rotor Volgograd players
FC Atyrau players
FC Sioni Bolnisi players